Heather Ann McDonald (born June 14, 1970) is an American stand-up comedian, actress and author. Born and educated in Southern California, she is known for her appearances on the E! series Chelsea Lately. She was one of the eight writers on the show and often participated in sketches and segments. McDonald also wrote and appeared in the show's spin-off, After Lately. She is the host of the pop culture podcast “Juicy Scoop with Heather McDonald.”  Her first book, a 2010 memoir of her college years, made the Bestseller List of the New York Times.

Early life
McDonald was born in 1970 in the San Fernando Valley, to real estate agent parents. She is of three quarters Irish and one quarter French-Canadian descent. She and her brothers and sisters were raised Catholic and attended private Catholic schools. After high school, McDonald attended the University of Southern California (USC), where she was a member of the Gamma Phi Beta sorority.

After graduating from USC, McDonald began to take theatre classes at The Groundlings. During her time there, McDonald performed improvisational shows and sketch comedy at the Groundlings Theatre. At the same time, McDonald became a licensed realtor like her parents.

Career
In the late 1990s, McDonald began writing with Keenen Ivory Wayans. In 2001 and 2002, she was a writer and performer for MTV's Lyricist Lounge. She made an appearance on Frasier as one of Frasier's many blind dates.

McDonald first gained popularity through her stand-up comedy shows in Los Angeles. She also began writing and performing for the Wayans Brothers in several of their films. She was a writer and roundtable regular on Chelsea Lately since its premiere in 2007.

In June 2010, McDonald published her first book, a memoir entitled You'll Never Blue Ball in This Town Again: One Woman's Painfully Funny Quest to Give It Up, which made The New York Times Best-Seller List. The memoir covers her college and sorority experience while attending the University of Southern California. McDonald published a second memoir in 2013, entitled My Inappropriate Life (Some Stories Not Suitable for Nuns, Children, or Mature Adults).

McDonald's standup special entitled Heather McDonald: I Don't Mean To Brag was recorded in 2014 and released on Netflix in September 2015. She also has a podcast called "Juicy Scoop with Heather McDonald," which began airing in June 2015.

McDonald has a repertoire of women characters of whom she does impressions in her standup routines.

On February 5, 2022, McDonald collapsed on stage during a live performance in Tempe, Arizona. She was taken to a hospital and treated for a fractured skull.

Personal life
McDonald is married to Peter Dobias, with whom she has three children. They reside in Los Angeles.  

McDonald attended college at the University of Southern California where she was a member of the Gamma Phi Beta sorority. While in college, she performed in local stage plays, including the critically acclaimed "Legend of Horseface".

Filmography

Film

Television

References

External links
Official website

Heather McDonald at Facebook

Living people
1970 births
21st-century American actresses
American film actresses
American impressionists (entertainers)
American television actresses
American people of Irish descent
American people of French-Canadian descent
American women comedians
University of Southern California alumni
21st-century American comedians